Calverley and Rodley railway station, originally called Calverley Bridge Station for the nearby river crossing, is a closed railway station on the line of the former Leeds and Bradford Railway (whose route now forms part of the Leeds to Bradford Lines, the Airedale Line, and the Wharfedale Line), near the villages of Calverley and Rodley, City of Leeds, West Yorkshire, England. It was situated on the left bank of the River Aire under Calverley Lane. The location now belongs to Horsforth.

History 

The station opened in 1846 shortly after the start of services on the Leeds and Bradford Railway. It had one island platform, two outer platforms, and some tracks serving a goods shed and a loading stage. It fell victim to the Beeching Axe,  closing to passengers in March 1965 and to freight in 1968 (along with the other intermediate stations between Leeds & Shipley).

Current situation 
While all tracks except for those of the mainline passing through the station site have been removed, the layout can still be inferred from the location of buildings in the former station grounds. The goods shed has been integrated into a warehouse complex used by local businesses, while the station building appears to be used as a private residence. The nearby Stanhope Hotel, featured in the book Welcome Inn, is being demolished in 2016, and several houses will be built on the site adjacent to the former station.

References

External links 
 
 

Disused railway stations in Leeds
Former Midland Railway stations
Railway stations in Great Britain opened in 1846
Railway stations in Great Britain closed in 1965
Beeching closures in England
Horsforth